"All Down the Line" is a song by the English rock band the Rolling Stones, which is included on their 1972 album Exile on Main St.. Although at one point slated to be the lead single from the album, it was ultimately released as a single as the B-side of "Happy."

Background
Written by Mick Jagger and Keith Richards, "All Down the Line" is a straight-ahead electric rock song which opens side four of Exile on Main St.. An acoustic version of the song was recorded in 1969 during the early sessions of what would become Sticky Fingers. Recording took place at Nellcôte, Keith Richards's rented villa in France, and at Sunset Sound Studios in Los Angeles.

The Rolling Stones gave a Los Angeles radio station a demo of "All Down the Line" to play while they drove around and listened to it on the radio.

After the release of Exile on Main St., Allen Klein sued the Rolling Stones for breach of settlement because "All Down the Line" and four other songs on the album were composed while Jagger and Richards were under contract with his company, ABKCO. ABKCO acquired publishing rights to the songs, giving it a share of the royalties from Exile on Main St., and was able to publish another album of previously released Rolling Stones songs, More Hot Rocks (Big Hits & Fazed Cookies).

Musicians
 Mick Jagger: lead vocals
 Keith Richards: rhythm guitar, backing vocals
 Mick Taylor: slide guitar
 Bill Wyman: bass
 Charlie Watts: drums
 Nicky Hopkins: piano
 Bobby Keys: saxophone
 Jim Price: trumpet and trombone
 Kathi McDonald: backing vocals
 Bill Plummer: standup bass
 Jimmy Miller: maracas

Concert performances
The Rolling Stones performed "All Down the Line" on every tour from 1972 to 1981 and have included the song on every tour since the Voodoo Lounge Tour (1994–95).

Live performances from June 1972 and November 1981 were included in the concert films Ladies and Gentlemen: The Rolling Stones and Let's Spend the Night Together, respectively.  A live version of the song from May 1995 appeared as a B-side of the "Like a Rolling Stone" (Live) single promoting the Stripped album.  A 2006 performance was captured on the concert film Shine a Light and the accompanying soundtrack album. Despite the popularity of "All Down the Line" as a live song, this was its first appearance on an official live album.  A March 2016 performance was included as a bonus track on Havana Moon, although it did not appear in the film of that name.

References

The Rolling Stones songs
Songs written by Jagger–Richards
1972 songs
Song recordings produced by Jimmy Miller
Songs about trains